Frédéric Havas (born May 17, 1973) is a retired volleyball player from France, born in Kaolack, Senegal, who earned a total number of 138 caps for the French men's national team.

International competitions
1999 – World League (7th place)
1999 – European Championship (6th place)
2000 – World League (7th place)

References
 Profile  at L'Équipe

1973 births
Living people
French men's volleyball players
People from Kaolack